The Pro A (formerly the Championnat National A (CNA)) is the highest tier professional basketball league in Tunisia. The league is organised by the Tunisia Basketball Federation (FTBB). Established in 1956, the league currently features 10 teams. 

Étoile Sportive de Radès is the record holder for most titles, with a total of thirteen.

The current champion is US Monastir, who won the title in the 2021–22 season. The champions of the league qualify directly for the regular season of the Basketball Africa League (BAL).

Current teams
The following 10 teams are the teams for the 2021–22 season:

League champions

1956 : L'Orientale
1957 : Stade Gaulois
1958 : Association Sportive Française
1959 : Jeanne D'Arc D'avant-Garde
1960 : Jeanne D'Arc D'avant-Garde
1961 : Association Sportive Française
1962 : Avant-Garde de Tunis
1963 : Stade Nabeulien
1964 : Union Sportive Radésienne
1965 : Étoile Sportive de Radès
1966 : Étoile Sportive de Radès
1967 : Étoile Sportive de Radès
1968 : Étoile Sportive de Radès
1969 : Étoile Sportive de Radès
1970 : Étoile Sportive de Radès
1971 : Étoile Sportive de Radès
1972 : Étoile Sportive de Radès
1973 : Zitouna Sports
1974 : Club Sportif des Cheminots
1975 : Stade Nabeulien
1976 : Étoile Sportive de Radès
1977 : Espérance Sportive de Tunis
1978 : Club Sportif des Cheminots
1979 : Espérance Sportive de Tunis
1980 : Espérance Sportive de Tunis
1981 : Étoile Sportive du Sahel
1982 : Ezzahra Sport
1983 : Ezzahra Sport
1984 : Étoile Sportive de Radès
1985 : Étoile Olympique La Goulette Kram
1986 : Étoile Olympique La Goulette Kram
1987 : Étoile Olympique La Goulette Kram
1988 : Étoile Olympique La Goulette Kram
1989 : Stade Nabeulien
1990 : Étoile Olympique La Goulette Kram
1991 : Étoile Olympique La Goulette Kram
1992 : Stade Nabeulien
1993 : Ezzahra Sport
1994 : Ezzahra Sport
1995 : Étoile Olympique La Goulette Kram
1996 : Stade Nabeulien
1997 : Ezzahra Sport
1998 : US Monastir
1999 : Ezzahra Sport
2000 : US Monastir
2001 : JS Kairouan
2002 : JS Kairouan
2003 : JS Kairouan
2004 : Club Africain
2005 : US Monastir
2006 : Stade Nabeulien
2007 : Étoile Sportive du Sahel
2008 : Stade Nabeulien
2009 : Étoile Sportive du Sahel
2010 : Stade Nabeulien
2011 : Étoile Sportive du Sahel
2012 : Étoile Sportive du Sahel
2013 : Étoile Sportive du Sahel
2014 : Club Africain
2015 : Club Africain
2016 : Club Africain
2017 : Étoile Sportive de Radès
2018 : Étoile Sportive de Radès
2019 : US Monastir
2020 : US Monastir
2021 : US Monastir
2022 : US Monastir

Finals
Only including finals from the 2009 season until now.

Titles per club

References

External links
Tunisian Basketball Federation Official Site 
AfricaBasket.com League Page

 

Tunisian Division I Basketball League
Basketball competitions in Tunisia
Basketball leagues in Africa
1956 establishments in Tunisia
Sports leagues established in 1956